Ye Wenling (born 4 November 1942) is a Chinese novelist. She was a member of the 6th, 7th and 8th National Committee of the Chinese People's Political Consultative Conference.

Biography
Ye was born in Chumen Town, Yuhuan, Zhejiang, China in 1942. She has a brother, Ye Peng.

Ye published her first short stories A Couple of Things and Seven Cents when she was 13 years old.

In 1957, Ye enrolled in the Huangyan High School, but she dropped out when her brother Ye Peng was labeled as a rightist by the government. Later, Ye worked in kindergarten and factory in the day and wrote short stories at night. She published her short stories Xuemei and Me, Love Thy Neighbours and Fenghuang A'jiao in East Sea.

From 1966 to 1976, during the Cultural Revolution, Ye published her short story When The Monthly Plan Was Finished in the Literature and Art Works.

In 1977, Ye published her short stories Danmei, Snowing in the Chinese New Year's Eve and The Chinese New Year's Eve Dinner in the People's Literature. In 1979, Ye joined the China Writers Association and worked in Henan Literature and Art Association. In 1980, Ye wrote the short stories Xinxiang, The Cane Chair and The Chinese Forget-Me-Not. In the same year, she won the National Excellent Short Story Award.

In 1986, Ye moved to Hangzhou and worked for the Zhejiang Writers Association. In 1990, she became the vice president of the Zhejiang Literature and Art Association. In 1992, she became president of the Zhejiang Writers Association and the Mao Dun Faculty of Arts.

From 1990 to 1995, Ye published novels Wumenggu, Wuweichuan and Wuyoushu.

Works

Long-gestating novels
 Wumenggu
 Wuweichuan
 Wuyoushu()

Short stories
 A Couple of Things
 Seven Cents
 Xuemei and Me
 Love Thy Neighbours
 Fenghuang A'jiao
 Danmei
 Snowing in The Chinese New Year's Eve
 The Chinese New Year's Eve Dinner
 Xinxiang
 The Cane Chair
 The Chinese Forget-Me-Not

Awards
 National Excellent Short Story Award (1980)
 Chinese Culture Creation Outstanding Achievement Award (1995, New York City)
 Lu Xun Literary and Art Prize (1997)

Personal life
In 1962, Ye married Wang Keqi in Neixiang County, Henan Province, Wang was a graduate student at Fudan University.

References

1942 births
People from Yuhuan
Writers from Taizhou, Zhejiang
Living people
Members of the National Committee of the Chinese People's Political Consultative Conference
Chinese women novelists